The 2013 Latin American Series was the first edition of the Latin American Series, a baseball sporting event played by the champions of the professional winter leagues that make up the Latin American Professional Baseball Association (ALBP). 

The competition took place at Estadio Universitario Beto Ávila in Veracruz, Mexico from February 1 to 4, 2013.

Participating teams

Tournament Bracket

Results

Preliminaries 

|}

Semi-finals 

|}

Final 

|}

References

External links 
 Official Site

Latin American Series
2013 in baseball
International baseball competitions hosted by Mexico
Latin American Series
Sport in Veracruz